Ireland participated in the Eurovision Song Contest 2021, having internally selected Lesley Roy as their representative with the song "Maps". She was due to compete in the 2020 contest with "Story of My Life" before the event's cancellation. "Maps" failed to qualify for the grand finale, placing last in the semi-final with 20 points.

Background

Ireland has won the contest a record seven times in total. The country's first win came in 1970, with then-18-year-old Dana winning with "All Kinds of Everything". Ireland holds the record for being the only country to win the contest three times in a row (in 1992, 1993 and 1994), as well as having the only three-time winner (Johnny Logan, who won in 1980 as a singer, 1987 as a singer-songwriter, and again in 1992 as a songwriter). In 2011 and 2012, Jedward represented the nation for two consecutive years, managing to qualify to the final both times and achieve Ireland's highest position in the contest since 2000, placing eighth in 2011 with the song "Lipstick". However, in 2013, despite managing to qualify to the final, Ryan Dolan and his song "Only Love Survives" placed last in the final. The Irish entries from 2014 to 2017 all failed to qualify for the final. Ireland once again qualified for the final in 2018 with the song Together performed by Ryan O'Shaughnessy, placing 16th in the grand final. However, in 2019, Ireland once again failed to qualify for the final, placing last in the second semi-final with Sarah McTernan and the song "22".

Before Eurovision

Internal selection
On 17 December 2020, RTÉ announced that they had again internally selected Lesley Roy to represent Ireland in Rotterdam. The song, entitled "Maps", was released on 26 February 2021. The song was written by Roy, Lukas Hällgren, Philip Strand and Emelie Eriksson.

At Eurovision 
According to Eurovision rules, all nations with the exceptions of the host country and the "Big Five" (France, Germany, Italy, Spain and the United Kingdom) are required to qualify from one of two semi-finals in order to compete in the final; the top ten countries from each semi-final progress to the final. The European Broadcasting Union (EBU) split up the competing countries into six different pots based on voting patterns from previous contests, with countries with favourable voting histories put into the same pot. For the 2021 contest, the semi-final allocation draw held for 2020 which was held on 28 January 2020, was used. Ireland was placed into the first semi-final, which was held on 18 May 2021, and performed in the first half of the show.

Once all the competing songs for the 2021 contest had been released, the running order for the semi-finals was decided by the shows' producers rather than through another draw, so that similar songs were not placed next to each other. Ireland was set to perform in position 7, following the entry from North Macedonia and preceding the entry from Cyprus.

Voting 
Voting during the three shows involved each country awarding two sets of points from 1-8, 10 and 12: one from their professional jury and the other from televoting. Each nation's jury consisted of five music industry professionals who are citizens of the country they represent, with a diversity in gender and age represented. The judges assess each entry based on the performances during the second Dress Rehearsal of each show, which takes place the night before each live show, against a set of criteria including: vocal capacity; the stage performance; the song's composition and originality; and the overall impression by the act. Jury members may only take part in panel once every three years, and are obliged to confirm that they are not connected to any of the participating acts in a way that would impact their ability to vote impartially. Jury members should also vote independently, with no discussion of their vote permitted with other jury members. The exact composition of the professional jury, and the results of each country's jury and televoting were released after the grand final; the individual results from each jury member were also released in an anonymised form.

Points awarded to Ireland

Points awarded by Ireland

Detailed voting results 
The following members comprised the Irish jury:
 Karl Broderick
 Louise Bruton
 Fidelma Kelly
 Sarah McTernan (jury member in semi-final 1)
 Luan Parle (jury member in the final)
 Ben Pyne

References 

2021
Countries in the Eurovision Song Contest 2021
Eurovision
Eurovision